Gerardo Enrique Parra (born May 6, 1987) is a Venezuelan former professional baseball outfielder. He played in Major League Baseball (MLB) for the Arizona Diamondbacks, Milwaukee Brewers, Baltimore Orioles, Colorado Rockies, San Francisco Giants and Washington Nationals, as well for the Yomiuri Giants of Nippon Professional Baseball (NPB). Parra is a two-time Gold Glove Award winner. He was on the Nationals when they won the 2019 World Series.

Career

Arizona Diamondbacks

On May 13, 2009, he was called up from AA (Double A) Mobile BayBears when left fielder Conor Jackson was placed on the disabled list. He was inserted into the starting lineup the same day, and in his first Major League at bat he became the 100th player in MLB history to hit a home run in his first at bat.

In his first five games he had at least one RBI, becoming the second player since Mike Lansing (1993) in the last 30 years to accomplish this feat. Parra was named NL Rookie of the Month for May and reached base in each of his first 17 games.

In 2011, Parra broke out batting .292 with 8 home runs and 46 runs batted in. Not only did he do well offensively, he also established himself as a threat with his powerful throwing arm, throwing  out runners on various occasions. He was a very underrated player in 2011 as he was a key ingredient  in leading the Diamondbacks turnaround.

After an outstanding season defensively Parra was awarded the 2011 National League Left Fielder Gold Glove award on November 1, 2011.

In an 18-inning game on 24–25 August 2013 at the Philadelphia Phillies, Parra collected a career-high five hits.  The teams drew a combined 28 bases on balls, a National League record.  The Diamondbacks' 18 walks tied the National League mark.  The game lasted seven hours and six minutes, the longest in franchise history for both clubs.

Milwaukee Brewers
On July 31, 2014, the Diamondbacks traded Parra to the Milwaukee Brewers in exchange for minor leaguers Mitch Haniger and Anthony Banda. Parra hit between Arizona and Milwaukee .261 with 9 home runs and 40 RBI's.

Baltimore Orioles

On July 31, 2015, he was traded to the Baltimore Orioles for Zach Davies. After a slow start with the O's, Parra tied a career-high in hits with five on August 16 in an 18–2 victory over the Oakland Athletics. The five hits were the most hits he had collected in a nine-inning game.

Colorado Rockies

On January 19, 2016, Parra signed a three-year contract with the Colorado Rockies. In his first season as a Rockie, he spent time on the disabled list. He played in 102 games, hitting just .253/.271/.399 with a strikeout to walk ratio of 73/9.

He bounced back the following season, hitting career highs in average (.309) and RBIs (71).

On April 13, 2018, Parra was suspended for four games due to his involvement in a brawl that occurred with the Padres two days prior. He ended his three-year contract hitting .284/.342/.372 with 6 home runs and 53 runs batted in.

On October 30, 2018, the Rockies declined the 2019 option on Parra's contract, instead paying him a $1.5 million buyout and making him a free agent.

San Francisco Giants
On February 12, 2019, Parra signed a minor league deal with the San Francisco Giants that included an invitation to spring training. In 30 major league games for the Giants, he batted .198/.278/.267. He was designated for assignment on May 3, 2019.

Washington Nationals
On May 9, 2019, Parra signed a one-year major league contract with the Washington Nationals. His first hit with the team was a go-ahead grand slam in a May 11 game against the Los Angeles Dodgers.

In a game against the Arizona Diamondbacks on August 3, Parra was called upon to pitch in the 8th inning with the Nationals trailing 11–4. He gave up 5 runs on 1 hit and 4 walks before being replaced by another position player, Brian Dozier, and the Nationals eventually lost 18–7. The 25 career pitches thrown by Parra are the most without retiring a batter since at least 2000.
 
In 2019 with the Nationals he batted .250/.300/.447. Between the Giants and the Nationals combined, in 2019 he batted .234/.293/.391 with nine home runs and 48 RBIs in 274 at bats. During his time with the Nationals, at the suggestion of his children, Parra changed his walk-up music to the popular children's song "Baby Shark". This became a crowd favorite throughout the second half of 2019, as crowds at Nationals Park began to sing along and do the accompanying motions whenever Parra came up to bat. Fans throughout the stadium were seen doing the "shark dance" when Parra was called up to bat in Game 4 of the 2019 National League Championship Series, and then again when Parra was called up to pinch-hit in Games 3, 4, and 5 of the 2019 World Series vs. the Houston Astros. The Nationals won the World Series in 7 games, their first in franchise history.

Yomiuri Giants
On November 20, 2019, Parra signed a one-year contract with the Yomiuri Giants of Nippon Professional Baseball. In 47 games with Yomiuri, Parra slashed .267/.305/.384 with 4 home runs and 13 RBI.

On December 2, 2020, he became a free agent.

Washington Nationals (second stint)
On February 3, 2021, Parra signed a minor league deal to return to the Washington Nationals. He was assigned to the Triple-A Rochester Red Wings to begin the season. On June 20, Parra was selected to the active roster. 

On March 13, 2022, Parra resigned a minor league deal with the Washington Nationals. He was released by the Nationals organization on May 1 without appearing in a game on the year.

Parra retired from professional baseball on May 8, 2022, and took a front office job with the Nationals.

See also

 List of Major League Baseball players with a home run in their first major league at bat
 List of Major League Baseball players from Venezuela

References

External links

1987 births
Living people
Águilas del Zulia players
Albuquerque Isotopes players
Arizona Diamondbacks players
Baltimore Orioles players
Colorado Rockies players
Gold Glove Award winners
Hartford Yard Goats players
Leones del Caracas players
Major League Baseball first basemen
Major League Baseball outfielders
Major League Baseball players from Venezuela
Milwaukee Brewers players
Missoula Osprey players
Mobile BayBears players
Nippon Professional Baseball outfielders
People from Zulia
Reno Aces players
Rochester Red Wings players
San Francisco Giants players
South Bend Silver Hawks players
Venezuelan expatriate baseball players in Japan
Venezuelan expatriate baseball players in the United States
Visalia Oaks players
Washington Nationals players
World Baseball Classic players of Venezuela
Yomiuri Giants players
2009 World Baseball Classic players
2013 World Baseball Classic players